The Women's Teams 4-5 table tennis competition at the 2004 Summer Paralympics was held from 23 to 27 September at the Galatsi Olympic Hall.

Classes 1-5 were for athletes with a physical impairment that affected their legs, who competed in a sitting position. The lower the number, the greater the impact the impairment was on an athlete’s ability to compete.

The event was won by the team representing .

Results

Preliminaries

Group B

Group C

Competition bracket

Team Lists

References

W
Para